Oxley Parish  is a civil parish of Gordon County, New South Wales. a Cadastral divisions of New South Wales.

The  parish is on the Hyandra and Whylandra Creek (tributaries of the Macquarie River), south of Dubbo, New South Wales, the nearest town.

References

Parishes of Gordon County (New South Wales)